Clough Fold Railway Station served Cloughfold near Rawtenstall, Lancashire, England from 1871 until the line closed in 1966.

References
Lost Railways of Lancashire by Gordon Suggitt

Disused railway stations in the Borough of Rossendale
Former Lancashire and Yorkshire Railway stations
Railway stations in Great Britain opened in 1871
Railway stations in Great Britain closed in 1966
Beeching closures in England